Feldberger Haussee is a lake in the Mecklenburgische Seenplatte district in Mecklenburg-Vorpommern, Germany. At an elevation of 84.3 m, its surface area is 1.31 km².

External links 

 

Lakes of Mecklenburg-Western Pomerania